Man Maneewan (5 October 1977 – ) is a Thai Luk thung singer from Isan area. He has many popular songs including Drunk on the day you got engaged (พี่เมาวันเขาหมั้น) and All ready in case it hurts (พร้อมทุกกรณีที่จะเจ็บ).

He has a birth name Yingkhun Prajanthon. Prajanthon was born on 5 October 1977 in Phibun Mangsahan District, Ubon Ratchathani Province. He has six siblings. He finished educated from Faculty of Education at Ubon Ratchathani Rajabhat University and Faculty of Business at University of the Thai Chamber of Commerce. He started on stage in 1997 as a singer from Krungthai Audio. He recorded first studio album  Drunk on the day you got engaged (พี่เมาวันเขาหมั้น, Phee Mao Wan Khao Mun) and it was very popular. In 2014, he moved to RSiam and recorded a single All ready in case it hurts (พร้อมทุกกรณีที่จะเจ็บ, Prom Took Koranee Tee Ja Jeb).

He has many concert tours in birth country or foreign. He has last concert tour in 2020 in Europe and returned to Thailand because of COVID-19 pandemic.

Discography

Studio albums
Krungthai Audio
 1997 – Drunk On The Day You Got Engaged (พี่เมาวันเขาหมั้น, Pi Mao Wan Kao Man)
 1998 – Does True Love Cares Too (รักแท้แคร์ด้วยหรือ, Ruk Tae Care Duai Rue)

R-Siam
 2014 – Man Wan Mun (แมน หวาน มันส์)

Singles
R-Siam
 2014 
 Het Phon Nam Nao (เหตุผลน้ำเน่า)
 Ao Yang Hed Jai (เอาหยังเฮ็ดใจ)
 Jao Klub Ma Ai Dee Jai Tae Klub Pai Ja Dee Kwa (เจัากลับมาอ้ายดีใจ แต่กลับไปจะดีกว่า)
 All Ready In Case It Hurts (พร้อมทุกกรณีที่จะเจ็บ, Prom Took Koranee Tee Ja Jeb)
 2017 – Rain Doesn't Fall Throughout The Sky (ฝนตกไม่ทั่วฟ้า)
 2019 – Muns Yod Na Rod Hae(มันหยดหน้ารถแห่)

References

1977 births
Living people
Man Maneewan
Man Maneewan
Man Maneewan
Man Maneewan